130 Hayden Station Road is an unusual Colonial-era brick cottage in Windsor, Connecticut.  Built in 1760 next to the Capt. Nathaniel Hayden House, it was probably built as a shoemaker's shop.  It was listed on the National Register of Historic Places in 1988.

Description and history
130 Hayden Station Road is located in northern Windsor, close to the north side of Hayden Station Road, and is separated from Clapp Road South by the Capt. Nathaniel Hayden House, which stands adjacent.  It is a -story gambrel-roofed brick structure, with a central chimney, and a shed-roof extension to the rear. The main facade is four bays wide, with the entrance in the center-right bay.  Windows are rectangular sash, set in unadorned openings that butt against the eave.

The structure was probably built about 1760 by Nathaniel Hayden.  Local historians have speculated that it served as a residence of the Hayden family prior to the construction of the larger house next door, but it is more likely that this was built as a shoemaking shop that the family is known to have run.  It is an unusual surviving element of the town's colonial heritage.

See also
National Register of Historic Places listings in Windsor, Connecticut

References

Houses on the National Register of Historic Places in Connecticut
National Register of Historic Places in Hartford County, Connecticut
Georgian architecture in Connecticut
Houses completed in 1760
Houses in Windsor, Connecticut